Gökhan Alsan (born 1 April 1990) is a Turkish footballer who plays as a midfielder for Boluspor.

References

External links

1990 births
People from Araklı
Living people
Turkish footballers
Association football midfielders
Trabzonspor footballers
1461 Trabzon footballers
Şanlıurfaspor footballers
Kardemir Karabükspor footballers
Gaziantep F.K. footballers
Samsunspor footballers
Büyükşehir Belediye Erzurumspor footballers
Boluspor footballers
Süper Lig players
TFF First League players
TFF Second League players